I.V. is the fourth studio album by the American hardcore punk band Loma Prieta. It was released on January 17, 2012, by Deathwish Inc. I.V. was written during an "intense and emotional" period in the lives of the band members.

Critical reception
Exclaim! called the album "a constantly shifting project, seamlessly weaving together melody, pummelling riffs, melancholic contemplation and an unmistakable Bay-area attitude," writing that the album "should be essential listening for anyone wondering what the future of hardcore is going to look like."

Track listing
 "Fly By Night" – 2:40
 "Torn Portrait" – 1:31
 "Reproductive" – 1:17
 "Trilogy 4 'Momentary'" – 0:56
 "Trilogy 5 'Half Cross'" – 1:21
 "Trilogy 6 'Forgetting'" – 3:02
 "Untitled" – 0:43
 "Uniform" – 2:12
 "Uselessness" – 2:20
 "Aside From This Distant Shadow, There Is Nothing Left" – 2:10
 "Biography" – 2:33
 "Diamond Tooth" – 3:18

References

2012 albums
Deathwish Inc. albums
Loma Prieta (band) albums
Albums produced by Jack Shirley